Dedication is a 1981 album by American singer Gary U.S. Bonds. 

The album was a critical and commercial success, marking a comeback for Bonds after several years out of the limelight. Dedication was the first of two albums on which he collaborated with Bruce Springsteen & the E Street Band, the second being On the Line, released the following year, 1982. The musicians accompanying Bonds on the album include many members of the E Street Band and the Asbury Jukes. The album includes three songs written by Bruce Springsteen, one written by Steve Van Zandt, and several covers of songs from the Beatles, Bob Dylan, Jackson Browne, and others. It also features a duet between Bonds and Springsteen on the track "Jole Blon".  Bonds' early 1960s sound had been a major influence on both Springsteen and Van Zandt. The songs written by Springsteen, including the cover of "Jole Blon", were originally intended for his 1980 album, The River, but he felt they fit better with Bonds and his versions of them have never been released although he has performed most of them live, often featuring Bonds as a special guest.

The album produced several singles.  The Springsteen-penned "This Little Girl" was a major success, peaking at No. 7 in Cash Box and at No. 11 on the Billboard pop chart.   It also reached No. 5 on the mainstream rock chart, as well as the Cajun traditional "Jole Blon",  which garnered some album-oriented rock airplay. The album itself reached No. 27 on the pop album chart and No. 34 on the R&B album chart.  Music writer Dave Marsh called Dedication "one of the most successful comeback albums in rock & roll history".

The album was re-released in 1994 on the Razor Edge label of Razor & Tie music, and then again in 2009 on BGO Records, paired with On the Line.

In a 2016 career retrospective interview with Pods & Sods, Gary revealed that a few additional songs and outtakes recorded during this time may eventually be released.

Track listing
 "Jole Blon" (Traditional; arranged Michael Hurley and Moon Mullican) - 3:25
 "This Little Girl" (Bruce Springsteen) - 3:42
 "Your Love" (Springsteen) - 3:28
 "Dedication" (Springsteen) - 3:11
 "Daddy's Come Home" (Steven Van Zandt) - 6:22
 "It's Only Love" (John Lennon, Paul McCartney) - 3:04
 "The Pretender"  (Jackson Browne) - 6:12
 "Way Back When" (Gary U.S. Bonds, George Bruno) - 3:58
 "From a Buick 6" (Bob Dylan) - 4:25
 "Just Like a Child" (Leroy Anderson, John Clemente, Lou Conte) - 3:43

Personnel
Musicians:
Gary U.S. Bonds - lead vocals
Bruce Springsteen - guitars, backing vocals (solo "Jole Blon")
Steven Van Zandt - bass, fuzz bass, guitar, bongos, backing vocals 
Roy Bittan - keyboards 
Clarence Clemons - saxophone, backing vocals
Danny Federici - accordion, keyboards
Garry Tallent - bass
Max Weinberg - drums
 Additional musicians:
Chuck Jackson & Ben E. King - vocals 
Ellie Greenwich, Carol Williams, Ula Hedwig, Brenda Hilliard, Carole Sylvan, Brenda Joyce Hillard, & Mikie Harris - backing vocals
John Clemente - bass 
Rusty Cloud - keyboards 
Lou Conte & Rob Parissi - guitar 
Rick Gazda - trumpet, backing vocals 
La Bamba - trombone 
Eddie Manion - tenor saxophone
Mike Micara - drums 
Michael Spengler - trumpet 
Joey Stann - baritone saxophone, backing vocals 

Production:
Gary U.S. Bonds, Bruce Springsteen, Steven Van Zandt, Rob Parissi, Lanny Lambert - producers
Garry Tallent - producer, associate producer
Larry Alexander, Tony Bongiovi, Bob Clearmountain, Neil Dorfsman, Bill Scheniman - engineers
Raymond Willhard, Dave Greenberg, Jeffry Hendirkcson, Garry Rindfuss - assistant engineers
Larry Emerine & Stephen Marcussen - mastering
Jimmy Wachtel - design, photography
Gloria Von Jansky - hand lettering
Dane Lawing - art direction

References

1981 albums
Gary U.S. Bonds albums
Albums produced by Steven Van Zandt
EMI America Records albums
Albums with cover art by Jimmy Wachtel